Handbook of the New Zealand Flora (abbreviated Handb. N. Zeal. Fl.) is a two volume work by English botanist Joseph Dalton Hooker with systematic botanical descriptions of plants native to New Zealand. The first part published in 1864 covers flowering plants, and the second part published in 1867 covers Hepaticae, mosses, lichens, fungi and algae.

References

Further reading 
 
 

New Zealand
Botany in New Zealand

Books about New Zealand